Ana Teresa Diego (b. 1954 – d. 1976) was an Argentine student of astronomy forcibly disappeared by the military dictatorship of Argentina during the Dirty War on 30 September 1976. The asteroid 11441 Anadiego now bears her name.

Background
Diego was born in 1954. She graduated from the La Plata Astronomical Observatory as an undergraduate in the 1970s. In 1975, her father, a mathematician working at the Universidad Nacional del Sur whom militants remembered as "one of the first professors in whom the Bahian student movement could trust," was killed.

Disappearance
While Diego was leaving the Communist Youth Federation facility in the El Bosque area of La Plata at noon, 30 September 1976, she was attacked and abducted by a gang of men that got out of two Fiats without license plates. Before being placed in one of the cars, she shouted her name for witnesses of the assault, and her apartment was raided by her assailants.

Legacy 
Diego's mother, Zaida Franz, was a founding member of the Mothers of the Plaza de Mayo and participated in the first meetings of family members in Bahía Blanca of the disappeared and the movement's first Marches of the Mothers in La Plata.

In the inaugural speech for her second term, Argentine President Cristina Fernández de Kirchner remembered Diego and linked her to a photograph of future Brazilian President Dilma Rousseff's arrest, saying "Today Dilma occupies the chair of one of the most important countries in the world, maybe this young woman [Ana Teresa Diego] could have been sitting in the same place as I am."

An asteroid, 11441 Anadiego, is named after her.

See also
List of people who disappeared

Citations

1954 births
1970s missing person cases
1976 deaths
20th-century Argentine astronomers
Argentine communists
Enforced disappearances in Argentina
Missing people
Missing person cases in Argentina
People from Bahía Blanca
Women astronomers